The 2017 Men's Hockey Africa Cup of Nations was the tenth edition of the Men's Hockey Africa Cup of Nations, the quadrennial international men's field hockey championship of Africa organised by the African Hockey Federation. It was held in Ismailia, Egypt from 22 to 29 October 2017.

Zambia withdrew before the tournament. The winner qualified for the 2018 Men's Hockey World Cup.

The six-time defending champions South Africa won their seventh title.

Venue
The location of the Africa Cup of Nations venue was the Suez Canal Authority Hockey Stadium in Ismailia.

Teams

Squads

Results
All times are local (UTC+2).

Preliminary round

Classification round

Third and fourth place

Final

Final standings

Goalscorers

See also
2017 Women's Hockey Africa Cup of Nations

References

External links
Official website

Men's Hockey Africa Cup of Nations
African Cup for Nations
Hockey African Cup for Nations
International field hockey competitions hosted by Egypt
Hockey African Cup
Ismailia
Africa Cup of Nations